These are the channels of the People's Television Network in the Philippines.

PTV stations nationwide

Analog

Digital

Digital affiliate stations

References

See also
People's Television Network

 

People's Television Network
Philippine television-related lists